Freeman Hotel is a historic hotel building located at Windsor, Bertie County, North Carolina. It was built about 1845, and is a two-story, five bay, frame Greek Revival style building. It features a double portico. From about 1888 until 1936 the building served Windsor as a hotel of eight rooms and two dining rooms.  The building was moved to its present location in 1981.

It was added to the National Register of Historic Places in 1982.

References

Hotel buildings on the National Register of Historic Places in North Carolina
Greek Revival architecture in North Carolina
Hotel buildings completed in 1845
Buildings and structures in Bertie County, North Carolina
National Register of Historic Places in Bertie County, North Carolina